In enzymology, a long-chain-alcohol dehydrogenase is an enzyme that catalyzes the chemical reaction

a long-chain alcohol + 2 NAD+ + H2O  a long-chain carboxylate + 2 NADH + 2 H+

The 3 substrates of this enzyme are long-chain alcohol, NAD+, and H2O, whereas its 3 products are long-chain carboxylate, NADH, and H+.

This enzyme belongs to the family of oxidoreductases, specifically those acting on the CH-OH group of donor with NAD+ or NADP+ as acceptor. The systematic name of this enzyme class is long-chain-alcohol:NAD+ oxidoreductase. Other names in common use include long-chain alcohol dehydrogenase, and fatty alcohol oxidoreductase. This enzyme participates in fatty acid metabolism.

References 

 

EC 1.1.1
NADH-dependent enzymes
Enzymes of unknown structure